Percy Richards was an English professional footballer who played as a centre forward. After leaving Plymouth Argyle he signed for Tunbridge Wells Rangers in 1930.

References

Year of birth missing
1965 deaths
Footballers from Manchester
English footballers
Association football forwards
New Mills A.F.C. players
Burnley F.C. players
Plymouth Argyle F.C. players
Tunbridge Wells F.C. players
Folkestone F.C. players
English Football League players